Ruth Price with Shelly Manne & His Men at the Manne-Hole is a live album by vocalist Ruth Price with drummer Shelly Manne's group Shelly Manne & His Men, recorded at Shelly's Manne-Hole in Hollywood, California, in 1961 and released on the Contemporary label.

Reception

The AllMusic review by Scott Yanow states: "Singer Ruth Price on this early set falls somewhere between swinging jazz, middle-of-the-road pop, and cabaret. She does not improvise much, but her strong and very appealing voice uplifts the diverse material that she interprets".

Track listing
 "I Love You" (Cole Porter) – 2:47
 "They Say It's Spring" (Marty Clark, Bob Haymes) – 3:35
 "Listen Little Girl" (Fran Landesman, Tommy Wolf) – 4:41
 "Dearly Beloved" (Jerome Kern, Johnny Mercer) – 2:38
 "I Know Why" (Harry Warren, Mack Gordon) – 3:57
 "Shadrack" (Robert MacGimsey) – 3:31
 "Crazy He Calls Me" (Carl Sigman, Bob Russell) – 4:29
 "Nobody Else but Me" (Kern, Oscar Hammerstein II) – 2:55
 "Nobody's Heart" (Richard Rodgers, Lorenz Hart) – 4:32
 "All I Do Is Dream of You" (Nacio Herb Brown, Arthur Freed) – 2:06
 "Who Am I" (Leonard Bernstein) – 4:19
 "Till the Clouds Roll By/Look for the Silver Lining" (Kern, P. G. Wodehouse/Kern, Buddy DeSylva) – 3:30

Personnel
Ruth Price – vocals
Shelly Manne – drums
Conte Candoli – trumpet
Richie Kamuca – tenor saxophone
Russ Freeman – piano
Chuck Berghofer – bass

References

1961 live albums
Albums recorded at Shelly's Manne-Hole
Contemporary Records live albums
Shelly Manne live albums